State leaders in the 10th century BC – State leaders in the 8th century BC – State leaders by year

This is a list of state leaders in the 9th century BC (900–801 BC).

Africa: North 

Carthage

Carthage (complete list) –
Dido, Queen (814–c.760 BC)

Egypt: Third Intermediate Period

Twenty-second Dynasty of the Third Intermediate Period (complete list) –
Osorkon I, Pharaoh (922–887 BC)
Shoshenq II, Pharaoh (887–885 BC)
Takelot I, Pharaoh (885–872 BC)
Osorkon II, Pharaoh (872–837 BC)
Shoshenq III, Pharaoh (837–798 BC)

Twenty-third Dynasty of the Third Intermediate Period (complete list) –
Harsiese A, Pharaoh (880–860 BC)
Takelot II, Pharaoh (840–815 BC)
Pedubast I, Pharaoh (829–804 BC)
Iuput I, Pharaoh (829–804 BC)
Shoshenq VI, Pharaoh (804–798 BC)

Asia

Asia: East

China

Zhou, China: Western Zhou (complete list) –
Gong, King (c.922–900 BC)
Yì, King (c.899–892 BC)
Xiao, King (c.891–886 BC)
Yí, King (c.885–878 BC)
Li, King (c.877–841 BC)
Gonghe Regency (841–828 BC)
Xuan, King (827–782 BC)

Asia: Southeast
Vietnam
Hồng Bàng dynasty (complete list) –
Mậu line, (c.968–c.854 BC)
Kỷ line, (c.853–c.755 BC)

Asia: South

Magadha of India, Brihadratha dynasty —
Satyajit, King (964–884 BC)
Biswajit, King (884–849 BC)
Ripunjaya, King (849–799 BC)

Asia: West

Aram-Damascus (complete list) –
Hadadezer, King (880–842 BC)
Hazael, King (c.842–800 BC)

Diauehi –
Asia, King (c.850–825 BC)
Utupurshi, King (c.810–770 BC)

Tyre, Phoenecia — 
Deleastartus, King (900–889 BC)
Astarymus, King (888–880 BC)
Phelles, King (879 BC) 
Ithobaal I, King (878–847 BC)
Baal-Eser II, King (846–841 BC)
Mattan I, King (840–832 BC)
Pygmalion, King (831–785 BC)

Kingdom of Judah —
Chronologies as established by Albright
Asa, King (913–873 BC)
Jehoshaphat, King (873–849 BC)
Jehoram, King (849–842 BC)
Ahaziah, King (842–842 BC)
Athaliah, Queen (842–837 BC)
Jehoash, King (837–800 BC)

Kingdom of (northern) Israel —
Chronologies as established by Albright
Nadab, King (901–900 BC)
Baasha, King (900–877 BC)
Elah, King (877–876 BC)
Zimri, King (876 885 BC)
Omri, King (876–869 BC)
Ahab, King (869–850 BC)
Ahaziah, King (850–849 BC)
Joram/Jehoram, King (849–842 BC)
Jehu, King (842–815 BC)
Jehoahaz, King (815–801 BC)
Joash/Jehoash, King (801–786 BC)

Assyria: Neo-Assyrian Period
Adad-nirari II (912–891 BC) 
Tukulti-Ninurta II (891–884 BC) 
Ashur-nasir-pal II (884–859 BC) 
Shalmaneser III (859–824 BC) 
Shamshi-Adad V (824–811 BC) 
Shammu-ramat, regent (811–808 BC)
Adad-nirari III (811–783 BC)

Dynasty IX of Babylon 
Shamash-mudammiq, (c.920–900 BC)
Nabu-shuma-ukin I, (c.900–888 BC)
Nabu-apla-iddina, (c.888–855 BC)
Marduk-zakir-shumi I, (c.855–819 BC)
Marduk-balassu-iqbi, (c.819–813 BC)
Baba-aha-iddina, (c.813–811 BC)
5 other kings, (c.811–800 BC)

Urartu (complete list) –
Arame, King (858–844 BC)
Lutipri, King (844–834 BC)
Sarduri I, King (834–828 BC)
Ishpuini, King (828–810 BC)
Menua, King (810–785 BC)

Europe: Balkans

Athens (complete list) –
Megacles, Life Archon (922–892 BC)
Diognetus, Life Archon (892–864 BC)
Pherecles, Life Archon (864–845 BC)
Ariphron, Life Archon (845–825 BC)
Thespieus, Life Archon (824–797 BC)

Sparta (complete list) –
Agiad dynasty
Echestratus (c.900–870 BC)
Labotas (c.870–840 BC)
Doryssus (c.840–820 BC)
Agesilaus I (c.820–790 BC)
Eurypontid dynasty
Soos (890 BC)
Eurypon (c.890–860 BC)
Prytanis (c.860–830 BC)
Polydectes (c.830–800 BC)

References

State Leaders
-
9th-century BC rulers